Wuqia Town is a town and the county seat of Wuqia County in Xinjiang Uygur Autonomous Region, China. Located in the middle east of the county, the town covers an area of 288 square kilometers with a population of 13,898 (as of 2017). It has 5 communities, its seat is at Tianhe Road.

History
Kiziloy Town  was formed in 1947 and renamed to Chengguan Town  in 1984. A magnitude 7.4 earthquake occurred in Wuqia County on August 23, 1985, and it was destroyed. the new town was rebuilt and named Wuqia in Borux, 6 km away to the northeast of the former town.

Overview
Basics for 2017
 Urban planned area: 39.4 square kilometers.
 Urban Built-up area: 6.68 square kilometers.
 Household: 4,856
 Household population: 13,898. of which
 Kyrgyz: 6,810 (49.00%)
 Han: 4,865 (35.01%)
 Uyghur: 1946 (14.00%)
 Others: 277 (1.99%)
 Per capita disposable income: CNY26,600 (USD3,940)
 Units within the jurisdiction: 125
 Individual industrial and commercial households: 964
 mosque: 1

Residential communities
The town has 5 residential communitiess under its jurisdiction.

 Borux 
 Urdo 
 Dosduk
 Bagqa
 Kanqgan

Infrastructure
The main streets of Wuqia Town include Tuanjie Road, Guangming Road, Bostanterak Road, Tuoyun Road, Kiziloy Road, Xingfu Road, Kangsu Road and Ulugqat Road. The Minzu Park is the main leisure place for residents. The Earthquake Monument was built at the northern end of Tuanjie Road. Wu Dengyun Exhibition Hall is located at the eastern end of Xingfu Road.

Tuanjie Road is the main road  in downtown and is north-south, it starts south from Gakang Highway and north to Guangming Road. It is l000 meters long and 26 meters wide with green belts on both sides, named in 1989. There are county bureaus of agriculture, tax, grain, commerce, and construction, administration for industry and commerce, PBOC, AgBank, etc. along the road.

Guangming Road is the main road east-west in downtown, starting from Toyun Road in the east and Tuanjie Road in the west. It is 950 meters long and 10 meters wide, there are green belts on both sides, named in 1989. Along the way are the CPC County Committee,  County Government, courthouse, public prosecutor's office and public security bureau.

References 

County seats in Xinjiang
Township-level divisions of Wuqia County